The House of Commons Standing Committee on Public Safety and National Security (SECU) is a standing committee of the House of Commons of Canada.

Mandate
The SECU committee has a mandate to review and study the policies and programs of the Department of Public Safety and its agencies:
The Canada Border Services Agency
The Canadian Security Intelligence Service
The Correctional Service of Canada
The Parole Board of Canada
The Royal Canadian Mounted Police 
The Security Intelligence Review Committee
The Commission for Public Complaints Against the RCMP
The RCMP External Review Committee
The Office of the Correctional Investigator
In addition, it has duties with respect to:
the investigation of the existence of drugs and alcohol in prisons
the creation of criteria for the appointment of the Commissioner of the Royal Canadian Mounted Police

Membership

44th Canadian Parliament

42nd Canadian Parliament

Subcommittees
Subcommittee on Agenda and Procedure (SSEC)

References

Standing Committee on Public Safety and National Security (SECU)

Public Safety